Fabrice Desvignes, born in 1973, is a French chef, and winner of the 2007 Bocuse d'Or. Desvignes is a second chef at the Présidence du Sénat in Paris.

Desvignes's prize-winning dish was a volaille de Bresse truffée (truffled Bresse chicken). During the course of the contest, a late delivery of two metal containers to Desvignes became the subject of controversy, with allegations made of cheating by smuggling precooked ingredients into the final. A contest director responded that the containers were delivered to Desvignes two minutes before he started work because snow delayed their overnight arrival, and these contained silverware and foie gras, which were not prohibited.

He is the son of the French chef Annie Desvignes.

References

1973 births
Living people
French chefs